Great Divide or The Great Divide may refer to:

Places
Continental Divide of the Americas, the most common meaning
Great Divide Basin, an endorheic drainage basin in south central Wyoming, US
Great Divide Montana, a ski area near Helena, Montana, US
Great Divide Mountain Bike Route, a bicycle route from Canada to New Mexico, US
Great Divide Trail, a wilderness hiking trail in the Canadian Rockies
Great Dividing Range, a mountain range on Australia's east coast
Great Dividing Trail, a hiking and mountain-biking track through the Goldfields region of Victoria, Australia

Film, theater, and television
The Great Divide, a 1907 play by William Vaughn Moody, with three film adaptations:
The Great Divide (1915 film), a silent film directed by Edgar Lewis
The Great Divide (1925 film), a silent MGM film directed by Reginald Barker, starring Alice Terry and Wallace Beery
The Great Divide (1929 film), a First National Pictures film directed by Reginald Barker, starring Dorothy Mackaill and Myrna Loy
"The Great Divide" (Avatar: The Last Airbender), a 2005 television episode

Literature
The Great Divide (novel), a 1935 novel by Alan Sullivan about the construction of the Canadian Pacific Railway
The Great Divide (Hodson book), a 1994 book by H. V. Hodson
 The Great Divide: The Conflict Between Washington and Jefferson That Defined America, Then and Now, a 2015 book by Thomas Fleming
 The Great Divide: Unequal Societies and What We Can Do About Them, a 2015 book by Joseph Stiglitz

Music
The Great Divide (band), a country music band

Albums
Great Divide (Semisonic album), 1996
Great Divide (Twin Atlantic album), 2014
The Great Divide (Allen/Lande album) or the title song, 2014
The Great Divide (Busby Marou album) or the title song, 2019
The Great Divide (Enchant album) or the title song, 2014
The Great Divide (The Generators album) or the title song, 2007
The Great Divide (Ice Age album), 1999
The Great Divide (Scott Stapp album) or the title song, 2005
The Great Divide (Tommy Shaw album) or the title song, 2011
The Great Divide (Willie Nelson album) or the title song, 2002
The Great Divide (EP), by Dragon, or the title song, 2011
The Great Divide, by Unida, 2003

Songs
"Great Divide" (song), by Hanson, 2006
"Great Divide", by the Cardigans from First Band on the Moon, 1996
"Great Divide", by George Jones and Tammy Wynette from Me and the First Lady, 1972
"Great Divide", by Jack Ingram from This Is It, 2007
"Great Divide", by Nick Carter from I'm Taking Off, 2011
"Great Divide", by Piney Gir Country Roadshow, 2006
"The Great Divide" (song), by Scott Stapp, 2005
"The Great Divide" (McClain Sisters song), 2012
"San Antone" / "The Great Divide", by Whiskeytown, 2009
"The Great Divide", by 311 from Stereolithic, 2014
"The Great Divide", by Anti-Flag from American Spring, 2015
"The Great Divide", by Billy Strings with Luke Combs, 2021
"The Great Divide", by Breaking Benjamin from Dark Before Dawn, 2015
"The Great Divide", by Celldweller from Offworld, 2017
"The Great Divide", by David Knopfler from Release, 1983
"The Great Divide," by Emmy Rossum from Inside Out, 2007
"The Great Divide", by Gene Watson, 1989
"The Great Divide", by In This Moment from The Dream, 2008
"The Great Divide", by Joanie Sommers, 1968
"The Great Divide", by Laibach from WAT, 2003
"The Great Divide", by Neil Young from Silver & Gold, 2000
"The Great Divide", by Pinhead Gunpowder from Goodbye Ellston Avenue, 1997
"The Great Divide", by Point of Grace from The Whole Truth, 1995
"The Great Divide", by Rebecca Black, 2016
"The Great Divide", by Roy Clark, 1974
"The Great Divide", by the Shins, 2020
"The Great Divide", by Velvetine, sung by Aruna, 2012
"The Great Divide", by VNV Nation from Of Faith, Power and Glory, 2009

Other uses
Great Divide Brewing Company, a microbrewery based in Denver, Colorado
Great Divide Trophy, presented to the winner of the Montana–Montana State football rivalry

See also
Across the Great Divide (disambiguation)
Along the Great Divide, a 1951 American Western film directed by Raoul Walsh
Asterix and the Great Divide, a 1980 comic by Albert Uderzo
Great Divergence, a historical shift during which the Western world achieved economic and political superiority over Eastern powers